Indonesia competed in the 2003 Southeast Asian Games held in Hanoi and Ho Chi Minh City, Vietnam from 5 to 13 December 2003.

2003
Nations at the 2003 Southeast Asian Games
2003 in Indonesian sport